Mark Patterson (born 24 May 1965) is an English former footballer who made nearly 500 appearances in the Football League playing as a midfielder for Blackburn Rovers, Preston North End, Bury, Bolton Wanderers, Sheffield United, Southend United and Blackpool. He went on to play, and then to manage, in non-League football.

Career
Patterson used to be a midfielder playing for a number of clubs over a long career including: Blackburn Rovers, Preston North End, Bury, Bolton Wanderers, Sheffield United, Southend, Blackpool, Accrington Stanley, Rossendale and Scarborough. Patterson started his coaching career with Scarborough as player-coach and then assistant manager under Russell Slade. Since then he has managed several non-league clubs including Chorley, Darwen and Leigh RMI.

After the exit of Scarborough managagment duo Neil Redfearn and his assistant Eric Winstanley, in the 2006 close season, Patterson took over as manager. Due to injuries and a small playing squad Patterson, at the age of 41, had to register as a player and has sat on the bench. He left the club on 4 May 2007 by mutual consent, having failed to agree a new deal. He was assistant manager to Phil Starbuck at Hednesford Town until February 2008. He later coached the Bolton Wanderers Academy and at Wigan Athletic and Accrington Stanley. In June 2017 he was appointed manager of AFC Darwen. However, he resigned in December that year with the club in the relegation zone.

In November 2021 his autobiography 'Old School - A Proper Football Education' (written with Kevin O'Hara) was issued.

References

1965 births
Living people
English footballers
Blackburn Rovers F.C. players
Preston North End F.C. players
Bury F.C. players
Bolton Wanderers F.C. players
Leigh Genesis F.C. players
Sheffield United F.C. players
Southend United F.C. players
Blackpool F.C. players
Scarborough F.C. players
English football managers
Scarborough F.C. managers
Chorley F.C. managers
Leigh Genesis F.C. managers
A.F.C. Darwen managers
People from Darwen
Premier League players
English Football League players
Association football midfielders